Henriquez or Henríquez may refer to:
Alexis Henriquez (born 1983), Colombian footballer
Amílcar Henríquez (born 1983), Panamanian footballer
Ángelo Henríquez (born 1994), Chilean footballer
Astor Henríquez (born 1983), Honduran footballer
Camilo Henríquez (1769–1825), Chilean priest, author, and politician
Craig Henriquez (born 1959), Biomedical Engineer, Professor at Duke University
Crisóstomo Henríquez (1594–1632), Spanish priest and theologian
David Henríquez (footballer, born 1977)
David Henríquez (footballer, born 1998)
Enrique Henríquez (1536–1608), Portuguese priest and theologian
Gregory Henriquez (born 1963), Canadian architect
Isabella Henríquez (c. 1610–c. 1680), Sephardi Jewish poet
José Henríquez (born 1987), Salvadoran footballer
Luis Henríquez (born 1981), Panamanian footballer
Louis-Marin Henriquez (born 1765), French writer
May Henriquez (1915–1999), Curaçaoan writer and sculptress
Miguel Henríquez (c. 1680-1743), Puerto Rican privateer
Óscar Henríquez (born 1974), Venezuelan baseball player
Oswaldo Henríquez (born 1989), Colombian footballer
Pedro Henríquez Ureña (1884–1946), Dominican Republic writer
Raúl Silva Henríquez (1907–1999), Chilean Catholic cardinal
Ronny Henríquez (born 2000), Dominican baseball player
Tatico Henriquez, Dominican musician
Thaïs Henríquez, Spanish synchronized swimmer

See also
National Library Felipe  Henríquez, Dominican Republic national library